Sidaogou (四道沟) could refer to the following locations in China:

 Sidaogou, Linjiang, town in Linjiang in southern Jilin
 Sidaogou Township, Weichang County, in Weichang Manchu and Mongol Autonomous County, Hebei